Hukić is a surname. Notable people with the surname include:

Jasmin Hukić (born 1979), Bosnian basketball player
Muamer Hukić (born 1984), better known as Marco Huck, German boxer
Mustafa Hukić (1951–1999), Bosnian footballer and manager
Nizah Hukić (born 1969), football manager

Bosnian surnames